The British Virgin Islands competed at the 1988 Summer Olympics in Seoul, South Korea. There were only three competitors.

Competitors
The following is the list of number of competitors in the Games.

Athletics

Men

Sailing

References

Official Olympic Reports

Nations at the 1988 Summer Olympics
1988
Olympics